Froggatt is a village and a civil parish on the A625 road and the River Derwent in the English county of Derbyshire.  The population of the civil parish at the 2011 Census was 204.  It is near the village of Calver.

Etymology
The name Froggatt could take its name from several derivations including Frog Cottage (Old English Frogga Cot),  and in 1203 a document recorded the settlement here as being Froggegate.

History
In the thirteenth century the manor of Baslow was divided into two moieties, one going to the Vernons and the other to the Bassetts.  Froggatt or Froggecotes as it was at that time was held by the Bassets.  About 1290 John Froggecotes of Froggecotes bought land and property including a grove of trees from Simon Bassett.  This land, plus more that was purchased from time to time, remained in the family until 1752 when the senior branch of the family died out.

John Froggecotes has many living descendants from a junior branch of the family headed by Thomas Froggott of Folds Farm, Calver.

Culture and community
Froggatt has a place of worship, a Wesleyan chapel and a pub, the Chequers Inn.

Landmarks
The village has a quaint seventeenth-century bridge, unusual in that it has two different shaped and sized arches.  There is a gritstone escarpment called Froggatt Edge nearby.

See also
Listed buildings in Froggatt, Derbyshire

References

 Derbyshire Record Office D3331 and D1490

External links
 Derbyshireuk.net
 Peak District On-Line

Civil parishes in Derbyshire
Towns and villages of the Peak District
Derbyshire Dales
Villages in Derbyshire